North East 3 was an English Rugby Union league which was at the ninth tier of the domestic competition and was available to teams in North East England.  Promoted teams moved up to North East 2 while relegated teams dropped to either Yorkshire 1 or Durham/Northumberland 1 depending on their location. 

At the end of the 1999-2000 the division was cancelled along with North East 1, North East 2, and their counterparts North West 1, North West 2 and North West 3, due to northern league restructuring by the RFU.  Most teams in North West 3 were transferred to their relevant regional leagues - Yorkshire 1 or Durham/Northumberland 1 - although one side went into Yorkshire 2.

Original teams

When this division was introduced in 1996 it contained the following teams:

Blyth - relegated from North East 2 (8th)
Bramley - relegated from North East 2 (13th)
Darlington - promoted from Durham/Northumberland 1 (champions)
Hull - relegated from North East 2 (9th)
Pocklington - promoted from Yorkshire 1 (champions)
Ripon - relegated from North East 2 (12th)
Sunderland - promoted from Durham/Northumberland 1 (runners up)
Thornensians - relegated from North East 2 (11th)
Whitley Bay Rockcliff - relegated from North East 2 (10th)
Whitby - relegated from North East 2 (7th)

North East 3 honours

Number of league titles

Darlington (1)
Pocklington (1)
Selby (1)
Westoe (1)

Notes

References

See also
 English rugby union system
 Rugby union in England

Defunct rugby union leagues in England
Sports leagues established in 1996
Sports leagues disestablished in 2000